Patricio Iván Acevedo Muena (born 9 April 1978) is a Chilean-born Palestinian former footballer. 

He has played for clubs in Chile, Malaysia and Indonesia.

Honours

Club
Universidad de Chile
Primera División de Chile (1): 2000
Copa Chile (1): 2000

External links
 
 

1978 births
Living people
Footballers from Santiago
Chilean people of Palestinian descent
Chilean footballers
Chilean expatriate footballers
Chilean expatriate sportspeople in Indonesia
Chilean expatriate sportspeople in Malaysia
Citizens of the State of Palestine through descent
Naturalized citizens of the State of Palestine
Palestinian footballers
Palestine international footballers
Palestinian expatriate footballers
Palestinian expatriate sportspeople in Malaysia
Palestinian expatriate sportspeople in Indonesia
Palestinian expatriate sportspeople in Chile
Universidad de Chile footballers
Everton de Viña del Mar footballers
PSMS Medan players
C.D. Antofagasta footballers
Kelantan FA players
Semen Padang F.C. players
Chilean Primera División players
Primera B de Chile players
Indonesian Premier Division players
Malaysia Premier League players
Expatriate footballers in Indonesia
Expatriate footballers in Malaysia
Expatriate footballers in Chile
Association football midfielders